Maya Le Tissier (born 18 April 2002) is a professional footballer who plays as a defender for Manchester United of the English Women's Super League (WSL)  and the England women's national team.

Club career

St. Martins A.C.
Le Tissier grew up on the channel island of Guernsey. She began playing football at the age of four for local boys' club St. Martins A.C., coached by her father, Darren. With no girls' teams on the island, Le Tissier began flying to Hampshire to play for the county team twice a month from the age of 13, doing so for two years until the time commitment meant she was missing too much school and too many training sessions. She continued to play for St. Martins until the age of 16.

Brighton & Hove Albion
On 1 July 2018, Le Tissier joined the academy at English Women's Super League club Brighton & Hove Albion. She was quickly promoted to the first team, being named as an unused substitute for a WSL match against Arsenal on 25 November 2018, and made her senior debut on 5 December, starting and playing the full 90 minutes of a 5–1 League Cup group stage win against Crystal Palace. She made her league debut four days later starting against Chelsea and scored her first goal for the club on 9 May 2021 in a 3–1 league win against Bristol City. She was named as Brighton Women's Young Player of the Season at Albion's end-of-season awards for both the 2020–21 and 2021–22 seasons. She was also nominated for PFA Women's Young Player of the Year in June 2022.

Manchester United
On 20 July 2022, Le Tissier signed a three-year contract with Manchester United. With one year remaining on her Brighton contract, the club triggered a release clause reportedly between £50,000 and £60,000. She made her club debut on 17 September 2022, starting and scoring two goals in a 4–0 opening day WSL win against Reading.

International career

Guernsey
Le Tissier made history when she became the first female player to play for the Guernsey under-16 boys' team, featuring in the under-16 version of the 2018 Muratti Vase against Jersey under-16s in March of that year.

England

Youth
Having been invited to an England under-15 south west regional camp, Le Tissier went on to captain the England under-15 women's national team. In September 2018, Le Tissier was named captain of the under-17s ahead of 2019 UEFA Women's Under-17 Championship qualification. England won all six qualification games without conceding and Le Tissier was named to the final squad for the 2019 UEFA Women's Under-17 Championship in Bulgaria. She started all three games as England were eliminated at the group stage on head-to-head goal difference having tied on six points with Germany and Netherlands.

Her step up to under-19 level came on 6 March 2020 against Sweden in the La Manga tournament. She made her under-23 debut at the age of 19 in a friendly against Belgium on 25 October 2021.

Senior
In November 2022, Le Tissier received her first senior England call-up for friendlies against Japan and Norway. She made her debut on 15 November, playing the full 90 minutes in a 1–1 draw with the latter opponent.

Personal life
Le Tissier's father, Darren, previously played semi-professional football for St. Martins A.C. She credits him for introducing her to the team of four-year-old boys he was coaching, of which she has said: "credit to the boys back home, if they didn't just see me as another footballer, then I might not be where I am today."

Despite coming from the same small island of Guernsey and sharing a surname, Le Tissier is not related to the former England international footballer Matthew Le Tissier, although the two families know each other and Darren had previously played football with Matt.

In May 2022, Le Tissier signed up to footballing charity Common Goal, pledging to donate at least one percent of her salary.

Career statistics

Club
.

International
Statistics accurate as of match played 19 February 2023.

Honours
England
Arnold Clark Cup: 2023

Individual
Brighton & Hove Albion Women's Young Player of the Season: 2020–21, 2021–22
Channel Islands Sports Personality of the Year: 2022

References

External links
 
 

2002 births
Women's association football defenders
Guernsey footballers
Guernsey women
England women's under-23 international footballers
Brighton & Hove Albion W.F.C. players
Manchester United W.F.C. players
Women's Super League players
English women's footballers
Living people